Tessmannia is a genus of flowering plants in the family Fabaceae.

It is native to Tropical Africa, and is found in the countries of Angola, Cameroon, the Central African Republic, Congo, Gabon, Ivory Coast, Liberia, Sierra Leone, Tanzania, Zambia, Zaïre and Zimbabwe.

The genus name of Tessmannia is in honour of Günther Tessmann (1884–1969), a German-Brazilian ethnologist and botanist. He was also an African explorer and plant collector, who later settled in Brazil. It was first described and published in Bot. Jahrb. Syst. Vol.45 on page 295 in 1910.

Known species 
As accepted by the Plants of the World Online as of February 2021:
 Tessmannia africana 
 Tessmannia anomala 
 Tessmannia baikieaoides 
 Tessmannia burttii 
 Tessmannia camoneana 
 Tessmannia copallifera 
 Tessmannia dawei 
 Tessmannia densiflora 
 Tessmannia dewildemaniana 
 Tessmannia korupensis 
 Tessmannia lescrauwaetii 
 Tessmannia martiniana 
 Tessmannia yangambiensis

References

Detarioideae
Fabaceae genera
Plants described in 1910
Flora of Africa
Taxonomy articles created by Polbot